The 2019 J.League Cup / Copa Sudamericana Championship, officially known as the 2019 J. League YBC Levain Cup / CONMEBOL Sudamericana Championship Final, was the 12th edition of the J.League Cup / Copa Sudamericana Championship (previously referred to as the Suruga Bank Championship until 2018), the club football match co-organized by the Japan Football Association, the football governing body of Japan, CONMEBOL, the football governing body of South America, and J.League, the professional football league of Japan, between the champions of the previous season's J.League Cup and Copa Sudamericana.

The match was contested between Japanese team Shonan Bellmare, the 2018 J.League Cup champions, and Brazilian team Athletico Paranaense, the 2018 Copa Sudamericana champions. It was hosted by Shonan Bellmare at the Shonan BMW Stadium Hiratsuka in Hiratsuka on 7 August 2019.

Athletico Paranaense won the match 4–0 to win their first title.

Teams

Venue

Format
The J.League Cup / Copa Sudamericana Championship was played as a single match, with the J.League Cup winners hosting the match. If tied at the end of regulation, extra time would not be played, and the penalty shoot-out would be used to determine the winner.

Match

Details

See also
2018 J.League Cup Final
2018 Copa Sudamericana Finals

References

External links
ＪリーグYBCルヴァンカップ/CONMEBOLスダメリカーナ 王者決定戦2019, Japan Football Association 
ＪリーグYBCルヴァンカップ/CONMEBOLスダメリカーナ 王者決定戦2019, J.League 

2019
2019 in Japanese football
2019 in South American football
2019 in Brazilian football
Shonan Bellmare matches
Club Athletico Paranaense matches
August 2019 sports events in Japan